In the years running up to the 2018 Italian general election, held on 4 March, various organisations carried out opinion polls to gauge voting intention in Italy. Results of such polls are given in this article. The date range is from the 2013 Italian general election, held on 24–25 February, to two weeks before the new election, 16 February 2018. Poll results are reported at the dates when the fieldwork was done, as opposed to the date of publication; if such date is unknown, the date of publication is given instead. Under the Italian par condicio (equal conditions) law, publication of opinion polls is forbidden in the last two weeks of an electoral campaign.

Party vote
The data on Forza Italia (FI) prior to 16 November 2013 refer to its predecessor, The People of Freedom (PdL), which at its dissolution suffered the split of the New Centre-Right (NCD). Since the 2014 European Parliament election most opinion polls have calculated the Union of the Centre (UdC) together with the NCD, even after December 2016, when the two parties parted ways. Since December 2014 results for Lega Nord (LN) have included its sister party Us with Salvini (NcS). Since November 2015 Left Ecology Freedom (SEL) started to be polled as Italian Left (SI), before finally be merged into it in February 2017. In the same month splinters from the Democratic Party (PD) and the Italian Left formed Article One (MDP), while other leftists launched the short-lived Progressive Camp (CP). In March 2017 the NCD was transformed into Popular Alternative (AP). In December 2017 the MDP, SI and minor groups launched a joint list named Free and Equal (LeU).

In the run-up of the election several other electoral lists were formed, notably including More Europe (+Eu), Together, Power to the People (PaP), Us with Italy (NcI) and the Popular Civic List (CP). Moreover, two broader alliances were formed: the centre-left coalition and the centre-right coalition.

Some polls may include the Communist Refoundation Party (PRC) instead of PaP.

Graphical summary

2018

2017

2016

2015

2014

2013

Coalition vote

2018

2017

Seat projections

Chamber of Deputies
 630 seats are available. 316 seats are needed for a majority.
 In some polls only the 618 constituencies in Italy proper are allocated, while the 12 abroad constituencies are omitted.

Senate of the Republic
 315 seats are available, plus 6 senators for life. 161 seats are needed for a majority.
 In some polls only the 309 constituencies in Italy proper are allocated, while the 6 abroad constituencies are omitted.

References

2018